A Sakhi is a historical account of Sikhism.

Sakhi may also refer to:
 Sakhi, Iran, a village in Khuzestan Province
 Sakhi, Nepal, a village
 Sakhi for South Asian Women, an anti-domestic violence organization
 Sakhi Dad Mujahid, former Deputy Defence Minister of Afghanistan under Taliban rule
 Sakhi (Meshrano Jirga representative), Afghan politician
 Sakhi (film), a 2008 Indian Marathi-language film
 Sakhi (magazine), a Kannada fortnightly women's interest magazine
 Alaipayuthey (film), a 2000 Tamil film dubbed into Telugu with the title Sakhi

See also 
 Gopi, a historical account in Hinduism